Candalides biaka is a species of butterfly of the family Lycaenidae, found on the island of Biak, in Indonesia. It was first described in 1963 by Gerald Edward Tite.

References

Candalidini
Butterflies described in 1963